Sam Hoare may refer to:

 Sam Hoare (actor) (born 1981), British actor and director
 Sam Hoare (rugby league), Australian rugby league footballer for the North Queensland Cowboys

See also 
 Samuel Hoare (disambiguation)